Sawran or Sauran is an ancient city located  north-west of the city of Turkistan in Southern Kazakhstan, near the river Syr Darya.

One of the earliest mentions of the city comes from the Arab geographer Al-Muqaddasi, who described it in the 10th century as "a large city surrounded by seven walls, mosque located in the inner city." In 1065, the city submitted to the Seljuq dynasty, which was part of the transformation of the Kara-Khanid Khanate into a vassal of the Seljuqs.

Around the 1370s, when the region was under the control of Urus Khan, Tokhtamysh of the blue horde, heavily supported by Amir Timur, tried to conquer the region, aiming to rule the cities of Sawran, Otrar, Saganac, Seiram, Serai, and others. The city provided the brick and tile for the construction of Mausoleum of Khoja Ahmed Yasawi, which was commissioned by Amir Timur in 1389; the mausoleum is 25 miles from the city.

By the 15th century, the city had established diplomatic relations with the Ming dynasty, which recorded the name of the city in the Ming Shilu as 掃蘭 (saolan). The poet Zayn al-Din Mahmud Vasifi visited the city from 1514 to 1515, and described the city's karez water infrastructure.

Like Otrar, the city suffered with the decline of Silk Road, and struggles for power in the region.

References

Ancient cities
Archaeological sites in Kazakhstan